Final Fantasy XIV is a massively multiplayer online role-playing game (MMORPG) developed and published by Square Enix. Directed and produced by Naoki Yoshida, it was released worldwide for Windows and PlayStation 3 in August 2013, as a replacement for the failed 2010 version of the game, with support for PlayStation 4, PlayStation 5, and macOS releasing later. Final Fantasy XIV takes place in the fictional land of Eorzea, five years after the events of the original 2010 release. At the conclusion of the original game, the primal dragon Bahamut escapes from its lunar prison to initiate the Seventh Umbral Calamity, an apocalyptic event which destroys much of Eorzea. Through the gods' blessing, the player character escapes the devastation by time traveling five years into the future. As Eorzea recovers and rebuilds, the player must deal with the impending threat of invasion by the Garlean Empire from the north.

The original Final Fantasy XIV, released in September 2010, was a commercial and critical failure. In response, then-Square Enix President Yoichi Wada announced that a new team, led by Yoshida, would take over and attempt to fix the issues with it. This team was responsible for generating content for the original version as well as developing a brand new game which would address all of the previous release's criticisms. This new game, initially dubbed "Version 2.0", features a new game engine, improved server infrastructure, and revamped gameplay, interface, and story. The original version shut down in November 2012 and was followed by an alpha test for Version 2.0.

The game released to largely positive reception; critics praised the game for its solid mechanics and progression, and they commended Yoshida for turning the project around. After a poor 2013 fiscal year, Square Enix executives attributed the company's 2014 return to profitability in part to the game's strong sales and subscriber base, reaching a total of over 24 million registered players by October 2021, also becoming the most profitable Final Fantasy game to date. The game has had a number of post-release updates produced for it, including four major expansion packs: Heavensward (2015), Stormblood (2017), Shadowbringers (2019), and Endwalker (2021).

Gameplay
Final Fantasy XIV is an MMORPG and features a persistent world in which players can interact with each other and the environment. Players create and customize their characters for use in the game, including name, race, gender, facial features, and starting class. Unlike in the original release, players may only choose to be a Disciple of War or Magic as a starting class—Disciples of the Hand and Land are initially unavailable. Players must also select a game server for characters to exist on. While servers are not explicitly delineated by language, data centers have been placed in the supported regions (i.e., North America, Europe, Japan) to improve the communication latency between the server and the client computer and players are advised to choose a server in their region. Regardless of server or language, the game features a large library of automatically translated game terms and general phrases which allow players who speak different languages to communicate.

Interface

The user interface and game controls are unified across the PC and home console versions. Players have the option of using any combination of a keyboard, mouse, and game controller to play; the former two are achieved on PlayStation 4 and PlayStation 5 via wireless or USB keyboard and mouse. By default, the system is navigated through drag and drop windows on PC. Navigation on the PlayStation version of Final Fantasy XIV is accomplished with a XrossMediaBar-like interface due to PlayStation users' familiarity with the set-up. This bar is used to access all menus, maps, logs, and configuration options. The head-up display for both versions includes a message log, party status menu, mini-map, and action bar. The player may customize the location of all of these elements.

The action bar and battle command input method differs slightly between the PC and home console versions. The PC version supports both point and click and keyboard selection of commands or macros from the action bar. Macro commands are customizable sequences of actions that allow players to execute desired abilities at a specific time. The home console versions instead map the action bar and macros to the "Cross Hotbar"—sets of four icons arranged in a cross shape. These are the grouped and accessed through a combination of the shoulder buttons and the directional pad or the face buttons. Using each shoulder button to cycle through the cross sets, players have quick access to commands. This interface is also available to PC players who use controllers.

Character progression
Players are able to improve their characters by gaining experience points (EXP)—when a set number of experience points are accumulated, the player's character will "level up" and gain improved statistics which further enhance performance in battle. Four primary sources of experience points in Final Fantasy XIV include completing quests, exploring instanced dungeons, participating in Full Active Time Events (FATE), and slaying monsters which exist in the game world. Quests, including the "main scenario" questline, are generally short, specific tasks given to the player by non-player characters which reward items and EXP. Completing main scenario quests progresses the overarching plot of the game. Guildleves are a type of repeatable quest which may be undertaken using level allowances. These allowances are limited but regenerate over time. Instanced dungeons are confined locations with specific objectives that must be achieved within a time limit. These dungeons often require multiple players to form a party before entry is granted. Some dungeons are for lower-leveled players to gain EXP quickly while others are for experienced players to collect rare items, equipment, and currency. The Duty Roulette puts players into a random instanced dungeon among the ones they have unlocked, and upon completion they are given an extra EXP bonus that scales with their level. This bonus is available once per day for each of the Duty Roulette categories. FATE is a new gameplay mechanic wherein a large number of players may participate in the same event, regardless of party status. These location-specific events include battles with notorious monsters, defending a location from invading forces, culling hostile local wildlife, and assaulting enemy fortresses, among other types. Finally, slaying monsters for EXP is aided by the Hunting Log, which tasks players with defeating specific enemies in exchange for EXP bonuses. Upon reaching the maximum level, character progression shifts to improving "item level" by acquiring new and better equipment. This equipment can be gained through a variety of sources including endgame dungeons, crafting, raids, primal battles, and elite mark hunts.

In addition to these player versus environment (PvE) challenges, three forms of player versus player (PvP) combat exist in Final Fantasy XIV. The first type, the Wolves' Den, is an arena featuring structured four-versus-four battles; a player may register with up to three teammates to challenge another four-person team. The second type, Frontlines, is a large battleground in which players form teams of up to 24 characters. Teams are delineated by players' allegiance to one of three Grand Companies and the team which reaches the target number of points first wins the match. Multiple modes are available, each with differing locations and rulesets. Within the fiction, Frontlines is presented as an organized set of military exercises between the three nations with the ulterior goal of jockeying for dominance of regions rich in magical artifacts. The third type, Rival Wings, is a battle arena mode where players manipulate minion waves and pilot mechs to destroy enemy objectives.

Battles and party system
Players fight enemies using a combination of physical attacks, weapon skills, and magical attacks; these battles form the basis of party play in Final Fantasy XIV. Most battle content in the game requires parties of a specific size, including four players for dungeons and eight players for boss battles. The "Duty Finder" is an automated matching feature that sorts players into parties for selected content across different servers. The "Party Finder" is a bulletin board where players may recruit players across servers for any kind of content including dungeons, raid battles, FATE parties, and more. Members of a party fill traditional MMORPG roles like tank, healer, and damage dealer. Tanks draw the enemy's attention away from other party members who generally have weaker defense, healers use restorative abilities and support the party with damage and enhancing abilities, and damage dealers focus on attacking the enemy. Teamwork and strategy are required to defeat the strongest enemies. "Limit Breaks" are special abilities that can only be performed if members of the party excel at their roles.

Free Companies are player-run guilds, organized bands of adventurers under the auspices of one of the three Grand Companies of Eorzea. Free Company members may gain access to a shared company chest, a private chat channel, and Company Actions which are 24-hour buffs to certain aspects of gameplay, such as increased EXP gain or reduced gear damage. Free Company members may also pool their resources to purchase a house in one of the residential districts. In addition to decorating the house, players may use the grounds to grow unique items through the gardening system, train their chocobo companion, embark on airship expeditions, and purchase a private room for personal use. Linkshells are another form of in-game networking; whereas players may only belong in one Free Company, they may join multiple linkshells which act as private chat channels for interested sub-groups.

Armoury and job system
Under the Armoury System, a character's equipped weapon determines the character class and players may change their class at will by changing weapons. Classes are divided into four disciplines: Disciples of War, masters of physical combat; Disciples of Magic, practitioners of the magical arts; Disciples of the Hand, crafters and handymen who synthesize and repair items; and Disciples of the Land, gatherers who collect resources from the environment. The Job System builds upon the Armoury System for Disciples of War and Magic. It allows access to powerful skills, magic, weapons, and armor exclusive to the job corresponding to that class. These jobs, many based on classic Final Fantasy character jobs, are more suited to party-based combat.

Game economy
The virtual economy of Final Fantasy XIV is largely player-driven. The exchange of items is facilitated by retainers—non-playable characters who assist in selling items on the Market Board, gather items through ventures, and provide additional item storage. A small transaction fee for all sales serves as a gold sink to regulate the inflation of prices in the economy. Players of any class may contribute to the supply of the economy: Disciples of the Land acquire raw materials from gathering points throughout the game world; Disciples of the Hand craft the materials into useful items and equipment; and Disciples of War and Magic are able to procure rare materials through completion of dungeons and Treasure Maps. Players are also able to contribute by extracting "materia" from well-used equipment, which can then be used to improve the statistics of other equipment.

The mechanics of crafting and gathering have changed between the original release and A Realm Reborn. Most of these changes are geared toward reducing the randomness and guesswork involved in these processes. For Disciples of the Hand, all recipes of the appropriate level are unlocked by default in the Crafting Log. Crafting abilities have been rebalanced to allow successful high-quality synthesis without requiring multiple mastered Disciplines of the Hand. For Disciples of the Land, players are allowed to select which item they would like to attempt to collect at a gathering point, whereas before, the results of gathering attempts were randomized. The Gathering Log also displays the names and locations of items that can be gathered in the world.

Plot

Setting

Final Fantasy XIV is set on Hydaelyn, a fictional world of diverse environments across three main continents, focused on the region of Eorzea. Four major city-states are featured: Gridania, in the heavily-forested Black Shroud; Ul'dah, a trade-centric sultanate in arid Thanalan; Limsa Lominsa, a thalassocracy found on the island of Vylbrand; and Ishgard, an isolationist theocracy in snowy, mountainous Coerthas. Eastward, a land bridge connects Eorzea to the other continents, conquered by the Garlean Empire. Other cultures include the various endemic tribes, such as Sylphs and Kobolds; scholarly Sharlayan, which practices strict nonintervention; and Ala Mhigo, the easternmost city-state of Eorzea, conquered twenty years prior by the Garlean Empire. In the face of the Garlean invasion, Ishgard withdrew from the Eorzean Alliance, leaving it nearly defunct. Resisting Garlean assaults has left the once-vibrant central territory of Mor Dhona a desolate wasteland.

Eorzea history is divided into "Astral" eras of prosperity and "Umbral" eras of decline caused by great Calamities. The First Umbral Era marked the end of the age of gods. The Twelve, guardian deities of Eorzea, retreated from direct mortal contact. As an Umbral era fades, society recovers and a new Astral era begins. The Third Astral Era represented the height of magic and technology, under the hegemonic Allagan Empire, which could build space stations, among other wonders. Each Umbral and Astral Era pair corresponds to one of the six basic elements—wind, lightning, fire, earth, ice, and water. The Sixth Umbral Era was believed to be the last, and thus the Seventh Astral Era would last forever, but five years ago, the Garlean Empire triggered the Seventh Umbral Calamity.

Garlean scientists, via Project Meteor, found a way to call down the lesser moon Dalamud as a weapon. Under Legatus Nael van Darnus, they planned to annihilate all of Eorzea by crashing the moon, destroying the Tribes and their primal deities and ruling the remnants. In response, the Alliance members reforged their bonds and revived their Grand Company militaries. Adventurers defeated van Darnus but could not stop Dalamud's continued descent. At the Battle of Carteneau Flats in Mor Dhona, between the Grand Companies and the Garlean legions, Dalamud revealed itself to be an ancient Allagan-made prison for the primal dragon Bahamut; his escape triggers the Seventh Umbral Calamity. Louisoix Leveilleur called upon the Twelve to imprison Bahamut, but failed; before he sacrificed himself to defeat Bahamut, he sent the adventurers "beyond the reach of time" for when they were needed again. Since then, the Garlean Empire has been embroiled in a succession crisis due to the failing health of its founder, Solus zos Galvus.

Characters
The player character is an Eorzean adventurer during the Seventh Umbral Era who joins one of the three Grand Companies: Gridania's Order of the Twin Adder under Elder Seedseer Kan-E-Senna; Ul'dah's Immortal Flames, under Flame General Raubahn Aldynn; and the Maelstrom of Limsa Lominsa under Admiral Merlwyb Bloefhiswyn. Their allies include Minfilia and her Scions of the Seventh Dawn, the unified remnants of two supporting organizations from the Sixth Astral Era, Louisoix's Circle of Knowing and Minfilia's Path of the Twelve. Members include Thancred, Yda, Papalymo, Urianger, and Y'shtola. Y'shtola often represents Final Fantasy XIV in crossovers like Theatrhythm Final Fantasy: Curtain Call and Dissidia Final Fantasy NT. Louisoix's twin grandchildren, Alphinaud and Alisaie, follow his example to aid Eorzea. Finally, Cid Garlond heads Garlond Ironworks, a technology company providing airships, weapons, and infrastructure to the Alliance.

Garlean antagonists include Legatus Gaius van Baelsar of the XIVth Legion and his lieutenants, Livia sas Junius, Rhitahtyn sas Arvina, and Nero tol Scaeva. The Tribes also threaten the uneasy peace by summoning primals, aetherial deities who deplete the land of its life-sustaining energy. Both are manipulated by the Ascians, inscrutable immortals hellbent on awakening their dark god Zodiark, whose revival imperils all of Hydaelyn.

Story
The game opens with a vision of the player character in battle with a masked man in black robes. The adventurer awakens from the vision on their journey to their starting city, Gridania, Ul'dah, or Limsa Lominsa. Returning players from legacy FFXIV appear in a column of light. Through odd jobs and tenacity, the adventurer joins their city's Adventurer's Guild, and is favorably compared to the Warriors of Light from the Sixth Astra Era, whom Louisoix saved, but whom no one can remember any details about. Masked men, like in the vision, make targeted attacks, and the adventurer gains aid from representatives of the Scions. Finally, they meet the secret society's leader, Minfilia. She reveals the visions are a power called the Echo, which marks them as a chosen representative of Hydaelyn, the Mothercrystal.

Freshly inducted, the adventurer and Thancred investigate abductions and crystal thefts in Thanalan, revealed to come from the Amalj'aa Tribe. They capture the adventurer to sacrifice to their primal, Ifrit, but the Echo blocks Ifrit's "tempering." Instead, the adventurer defeats Ifrit, and is hailed a hero, courted by all three Grand Companies. During memorial services for the dead at Carteneau, the player meets Alphinaud and Alisaie, who part ways over disagreement about the purpose of such displays. The adventurer is assigned to the Black Shroud to forge ties with the Sylphs, a peaceful tribe whose radical faction has summoned the primal Ramuh against the Garleans. While rescuing the Sylph elder, the adventurer encounters another masked man, Lahabrea, revealed to be a leader of the mysterious Ascians.

The adventurer investigates, but Lahabrea twice eludes them. Minfilia sends them to thwart the freshly-summoned Kobold primal, Titan, so they recruit the retired primal-fighting Company of Heroes. After a series of miscellaneous tasks, the Company's leader reveals the way, and the adventurer defeats Titan, learning that Lahabrea is working alongside Legatus Gaius van Baelsar of the XIVth Imperial Legion. The adventurer returns to the Scions' headquarters to find slaughter: Minfilia and others were captured, and everyone else was slain, by the Garleans. After funeral rites for the fallen, Alphinaud returns to recruit the adventurer, aiming to defeat the freshly-summoned Ixal Tribe primal, Garuda. To confront Garuda in her own domain, they must awaken the memories of the amnesiac genius engineer, Cid Garlond.

Cid, Alphinaud, and the adventurer travel to Coerthas, territory of reclusive Ishgard, seeking Cid's lost airship, the Enterprise. After befriending Isghardian commander Haurchefant Greystone and foiling a heretic plot, they recover the Enterprise in the Stone Vigil, a fortress overrun by dragons. Cid, aided by the adventurer's Echo, regains his memories as a Garlean engineer, Eorzean defector, and genius inventor. The adventurer eventually acquires a rare crystal to cut through Garuda's vortex, and the two fight until Garuda torments Kobold and Amalj'aa prisoners of war into resummoning Ifrit and Titan. However, Gaius and Lahabrea intercede with the Ultima Weapon, an Allagan machine, which consumes all three primals to increase it's power. At Lahabrea's urging, Gaius plans to use the Ultima Weapon to conquer Eorzea, but the Ascian secretly intends to start another calamity with it.

After recovering additional members, the Scions rescue Minfilia and the others from the Garleans, learning that Lahabrea has possessed Thancred. Barging into a meeting of the Alliance leadership, Alphinaud and Minfilia persuade them to choose resistance instead of surrender. The Scions join the Alliance in executing a massive counteroffensive, Operation Archon. Ultimately, the adventurer assaults Gaius' stronghold, the Praetorium, where Gaius pilots the Ultima Weapon and battles them. Shielded by Hydaelyn's Blessing of Light, the adventurer destroys the Ultima Weapon, leaving Gaius behind in the explosion. Lahabrea defeats the adventurer himself, revealing the calamities are part of a process to resurrect the Ascians' God, Zodiark. Hydaelyn revives them and they purge Lahabrea from Thancred's body, fulfilling the vision from the prologue. Victorious, Alliance leaders declare the Seventh Astral Era. The adventurer is declared the new Warrior of Light; for Legacy characters their victory restores everyone's memories of the Warrior. In a post-credits scene, a recovering Lahabrea and other Ascians prepare for the return of Bahamut.

Seventh Astral Era

Facing increasing scrutiny and pressure to align with one of the three allied city-states, the Scions relocate their headquarters to Revenant's Toll, a hub for adventurers in the neutral territory of Mor Dhona. No sooner are they settled when word arrives that a renegade moogle faction has summoned their primal Good King Moggle Mog XII, enabled by the Ascians. After besting the giant moogle, the Warrior of Light encounters the Ascian Emissary, Elidibus, who tests the player's might before disappearing. Shortly thereafter, refugees arrive from Doma, a nation subjugated by the Garlean Empire, and seek asylum in Ul'dah, where their request is refused. Alphinaud recommends they work as tradesmen in the construction of Revenant's Toll. In gratitude, the Doman leader, Yugiri, accompanies the party to reconnoiter the Sahagin spawning grounds where their primal Leviathan is summoned. The adventurer slays the revived Leviathan using two boats' worth of corrupted crystals, courtesy of Lominsan warship The Whorleater.

Alphinaud inquires about the cause of riots among Ala Mhigan refugees in Ul'dah and uncovers the agents of Teledji Adeledji, an influential member of Ul'dah's ruling Syndicate. Raubahn speculates that Adeledji is jockeying for control of artifacts discovered at the Carteneau ruins, including remnants of the Allagan superweapon known as Omega. In the Black Shroud, the Sylphs summon Ramuh who judges the Warrior of Light as a worthy savior of the realm, departing amicably. Meanwhile, Alphinaud incorporates the Crystal Braves as neutral police force for Eorzea. Their first task is to investigate the "Ivy", a Garlean spy who has infiltrated the Immortal Flames' leadership. Haurchefant and Ser Aymeric of the Temple Knights of Ishgard reaches out to the Scions and Braves in an unprecedented move to ask for their aid in monitoring the Keeper of the Lake—the wreckage of a Garlean airship intertwined with the corpse of Midgardsormr, the dragon king who repelled the Garlean advance fifteen years previous. In exchange, Haurchefant agrees to safeguard supply shipments to Revenant's Toll, which had been harried by the followers of Lady Iceheart, an Ishgardian turncoat.

The Garlean civil war ends with Varis zos Galvus assuming the throne as emperor, lending new urgency to the search for Ivy. The Braves discover that Ivy is Raubahn's trusted advisor Eline Roaille, who is captured at the gates of a Garlean Castrum. A new Scion, Moenbryda, arrives from Sharlayan and provides critical advice for locating Iceheart. Using her body as a vessel, Iceheart summons Shiva into herself and challenges the Warrior of Light. Though the adventurer's band defeats Shiva, Iceheart escapes, bidding the meddler to consult with Midgardsormr. Based on the player's encounters with Lahabrea and Shiva, Moenbryda hypothesizes that a blade of pure aether can permanently destroy an Ascian while its essence is trapped within white auracite. Lucia of the Temple Knights requests that the Warrior of Light investigate suspicious activity at the Keeper of the Lake where the adventurer discovers that Midgardsormr lives on, slowly regenerating from his apparent death. He divulges that Nidhogg, one of his seven children, has rallied the Dravanian horde to renew their attack on Ishgard. Sensing the hero's connection to Hydaelyn, Midgardsormr invokes an ancient pact with the Mothercrystal and seals away her blessing as a test of the player's worth. The Ascian Nabriales takes advantage of the opportunity to infiltrate the Scions' headquarters in pursuit of Louisoix's staff. Moenbryda sacrifices herself to create the blade of aether necessary to completely destroy the Ascian.

As the Scions mourn their fallen comrade, Aymeric parleys for aid in Ishgard's defense against Nidhogg's forces. Minfilia and Alphinaud reluctantly pledge the Scions' support while the rest of the Alliance decline due to both domestic troubles and remembering Ishgard's reticence during the three Garlean invasions. The adventurer and the Scions repel Nidhogg's forces at the Steps of Faith, Ishgard's main bridge. A victory celebration is held at Ul'dah with the hopes of pressuring Ishgard into the Alliance. At the banquet, Ul'dah's sultana Nanamo Ul Namo privately discloses to the Warrior of Light that she plans to dissolve the monarchy to erode the power of the Syndicate, the source of much of Ul'dah's corruption. However, Nanamo succumbs to poisoned wine and collapses; Adeledji immediately accuses the adventurer of being responsible and has them arrested. When he denounces Raubahn for his negligence, the enraged Raubahn kills him. Lolorito, another scheming Syndicate member, takes this as proof of Raubahn's guilt and has him arrested. The Crystal Braves are revealed to be in the pay of Lolorito and pursue the Scions, most of whom stay behind to cover their escape. Only a humbled Alphinaud and the Warrior of Light manage to escape with the help of Raubahn's son Pipin Tarupin. Cid takes them to Coerthas where Haurchefant grants them asylum from their Syndicate pursuers.

Development

The original release of Final Fantasy XIV began development under the codename Rapture between late 2004 and early 2005, and was officially announced in 2009. This version was directed by Nobuaki Komoto and produced by Hiromichi Tanaka, who was also serving as the producer of Final Fantasy XI, and employed the Crystal Tools engine, which had previously been used for Final Fantasy XIII. Following a bug-laden, abbreviated beta test period, the game released in September 2010 to near-universal negative reception. After two extensions to the initial free trial period, then-Square Enix President Yoichi Wada issued a formal apology to players and fans in December 2010, and announced a dramatic overhaul in the development team, most prominently the removal of Tanaka from the project and the demotion of Komoto from Director to Lead Designer. Monthly fees for the game were suspended until further notice and the previously planned PlayStation 3 version was canceled. After the change in development team, Naoki Yoshida, who had worked as planning chief of Dragon Quest X, was brought in to supervise the project as both producer and director.

In attempting to improve Final Fantasy XIV, Yoshida quickly discovered a number of key tasks. First and foremost, he had to restore trust in the player base while bringing the game up to a playable quality. To address this, Yoshida began writing "Letters from the Producer" which would discuss design direction, upcoming changes, player feedback, and increase transparency in the development process. However, outdated and cumbersome programming choices in the source code prevented the more radical modifications necessary to enhance the game. Thus, planning for a brand new game built from scratch started in January 2011 and development began in earnest by April, with work on a new game engine and server structure. Meanwhile, the team's efforts to improve the original release first came to fruition with patch 1.18 in July 2011, which included major changes to the battle system, implementation of auto-attack and instanced dungeons, removal of the controversial "fatigue" system, and the introduction of the Grand Company storyline which would supersede the original main scenario questline. Subsequent patches would further refine the gameplay as well as set the stage for the Seventh Umbral Era events.

On the anniversary of the game's release, Wada claimed that the initial launch of Final Fantasy XIV had "greatly damaged" the Final Fantasy brand. Thus, Wada and Yoshida announced the brand new version of Final Fantasy XIV in October 2011, code-named "Version 2.0", which had been in development since January, along with a tentative roadmap for future progress for both PC and PlayStation 3. Current players would be provided copies of the new PC client at launch, free of charge, and their character data and progress would be transferred as well. Along with the roadmap, they announced that monthly fees would be instated in order to offset the cost of redevelopment. Billing for the game began in January 2012. To encourage users to continue playing while paying subscription fees, Yoshida revealed the "Legacy Campaign" which rewarded players who paid for at least three months of service with permanently reduced monthly payments, an exclusive in-game chocobo mount, and their names featured in the credits of Version 2.0.

At Electronic Entertainment Expo 2012, Square Enix debuted "Agni's Philosophy", a tech demo for their new Luminous Studio game engine. Though members of the Final Fantasy XIV development team worked on Luminous, Yoshida admitted that both Luminous and Crystal Tools were optimized for offline games and could not handle an online environment with hundreds of on-screen character models. Though Version 2.0 uses a "completely different engine", he called the Luminous engine and the 2.0 engine "siblings" due to similarities in their structure. In July 2012, Square Enix revealed that Version 2.0's official title would be Final Fantasy XIV: A Realm Reborn. As development for A Realm Reborn ramped up, Yoshida made the decision to shut down the servers for the original release on November 11, 2012. This date served as the "grand finale" for the old game, culminating in a cinematic trailer for A Realm Reborn called "End of an Era".

In a project postmortem Game Developers Conference 2014, Yoshida reflected on the herculean task of maintaining and updating an MMORPG while simultaneously developing a new one over the course of just two years and eight months. He identified three main reasons why the original launch failed: an over-emphasis on graphical quality, a lack of modern MMORPG expertise in the development team, and a mentality that all problems could be fixed in future patches. These evolved from the team's prior experience on Final Fantasy XI, the previous MMORPG in the Final Fantasy series. As the series has been renowned for its state-of-the-art graphics, the original development team gained an unhealthy obsession with maximizing graphical quality at the expense of server performance, which was unsustainable for an online game with tens of thousands of high definition assets. In designing Final Fantasy XI, the team spent a year playing EverQuest, the most successful MMORPG of the early 2000s. However, they lacked experience with modern games in the genre; the original Final Fantasy XIV team was instructed merely to make something "different from Final Fantasy XI". Yoshida admonished that the team should "go play World of Warcraft for a year [for inspiration]" instead.

A prevailing design philosophy for A Realm Reborn was to simultaneously appeal to hardcore MMORPG players while reaching out to new players and Final Fantasy fans who had never experienced the genre before. As a consequence, Yoshida held optimizing gameplay for controllers as a top priority. To streamline development, he made about 400 fundamental design decisions which eliminated time lost to getting approvals, with a focus on implementing standard features of the genre first. The new workflow pipeline was tested using updates to the original game and applied to development of A Realm Reborn. The continuing operations of the original release provided a valuable testing ground for new features that would be carried into the relaunch. Another focus was to appeal to busy players without a lot of free time, which led to creating the Duty Finder system. The base game and patch cycle were also designed to make it easy for lapsed players to return to. Throughout this process, Yoshida emphasized that communication with players and restoring their trust was key, even admitting that sales were secondary compared to redeeming the reputation of the series. Live streaming conversations between the development team and fans, such as the Letters from the Producer LIVE events, became a major element of Yoshida's player outreach strategy.

Testing and release

The alpha test for A Realm Reborn began shortly after the original release's finale and ended in late December 2012. During this period, Wada admitted that the development of A Realm Reborn was a cause of delay for many Square Enix titles at the time. Yoshida published an updated roadmap for the beta test through launch, indicating four phases of beta beginning in mid-February 2013. He claimed that the team is "adamant the game not be released until it is ready" and that launching too early "would be like at the level of destroying the company". In May 2013, Square Enix announced the release date for the game, along with details about pre-order bonuses and the collector's edition, which includes an art book, a bonus disc with a recap of the original release story, a soundtrack sampler, and several cosmetic in-game items. In June 2013, the company revealed a PlayStation 4 version was in development and due for release in 2014. Early access began on August 24, 2013, with players able to play continuously through to the August 27 launch. Players throughout this period noted continued server issues. Due to an "overwhelmingly positive response", the servers could not handle the number of concurrent players, prompting Square Enix to temporarily suspend digital sales of the game. In light of these issues, Yoshida issued an apology to fans for the game's "rocky" launch and reassured them that fixes were in progress and new servers would be created. A week after launch, the game received a ten-hour maintenance and fresh patches, and all players were compensated with a week of free play time.

A Steam version of the client was released on February 14, 2014. A beta for the PlayStation 4 version of Final Fantasy XIV: A Realm Reborn debuted on the same day as the Japanese release of the console, February 22, 2014. Owners of the PlayStation 3 client were able upgrade to the digital PlayStation 4 client for free. A free trial of the game first became available for PC on July 31, 2014, with PlayStation 3 and 4 versions following in December. It initially limited prospective players to content under level 35 but this was expanded to level 60 in August 2020, allowing free access to all of A Realm Reborn and Heavensward with no time restrictions. The Chinese version, published and administrated by Shanda Games, premiered on August 29, 2014, featuring content through patch 2.16. It features separate servers from the other language versions of the game and a pay-per-hour micropayment billing system. The Korean version, distributed by Actoz Soft, launched in South Korea on August 14, 2015, with content from patch 2.2. This version carries a flexible subscription model with increments as low as 5 hours, similar to the Chinese release, up to 90 days, much like the traditional monthly payment plan. With the release of later patches, versions and expansion packs, the "A Realm Reborn" subtitle has been dropped, with the remade game being referred to simply as Final Fantasy XIV. Fans now refer to the story arc encompassing up to the last patch as "2.0" or "A Realm Reborn", to differentiate it from the later expansions.

Coinciding with the launch of the first expansion pack, the macOS client was released on June 23, 2015. The port was handled by TransGaming. On July 3, 2015, Square Enix suspended sales of the macOS version because of widespread reports of poor technical performance and offered refunds to those who purchased it. Yoshida observed that the performance issues could be attributed to difficulties in transposing the game from Microsoft's proprietary DirectX graphical rendering libraries to OpenGL as well as a clerical error resulting in publishing the wrong minimum system requirements, both compounded by the hectic work schedule demanded by the release of an expansion pack. After new rounds of testing and optimization, sales of the macOS version resumed on February 23, 2016. In November 2019, Phil Spencer told the press that Xbox is working with Square Enix to bring the game to Xbox One. No official announcement was made however, with director Naoki Yoshida stating in an October 2021 interview that discussions are "positive", but still ongoing, and that the team is waiting for the right time to provide an update. Around the same time, Yoshida also confirmed to GameSpot that talks with Nintendo were ongoing, in order to also bring the game to Nintendo Switch, remarking that the addition of Xbox and Switch as supported platforms for the game would increase its overall footprint despite its already active userbase, and that "So as long as the regulations with the counterpart hardware companies ... we can actually pass that, then the possibility, the chance is quite high [of Final Fantasy XIV coming to Xbox and Nintendo systems]".

Patches and expansions
The development team schedules the release of a major update approximately every three months. Each of these free content patches includes a continuation of the main scenario as well as new raids, features, trials, and dungeons. Minor patches that come in between major updates focus on quality of life changes, and are sometimes used to introduce completely new side content. In addition to regular free updates, the game features full expansion packs that add new zones, races, jobs, and premiere a new content cycle. Since the release of these expansions, the original subtitle of A Realm Reborn has come to refer to the portion of the game available at launch, rather than the entirety of Final Fantasy XIV. Patch 5.3 of the Shadowbringers expansion also modifies and streamlines the A Realm Reborn main scenario questline, and patches 6.1 and 6.2 of the Endwalker expansion included further changes to the A Realm Reborn and Heavensward questlines.

Music

Masayoshi Soken contributed to the majority of the game's version of traditional Final Fantasy music, as well as themes original to the game. The enormous track list includes remixed versions of songs such as the Final Fantasy theme, originally composed by long time Final Fantasy composer Nobuo Uematsu, as well as remixes of day and night themes original to Final Fantasy XIV. For the reboot A Realm Reborn, Soken was tasked with composing and compiling numerous original and remixed songs, in addition to his duties as sound director. The remaining tracks were reused pieces from the original game's soundtrack which was principally composed by Nobuo Uematsu, with assistance from Soken, Tsuyoshi Sekito, and Naoshi Mizuta. Yoshida directed Soken to "give us something straightforward that anyone could identify as Final Fantasy, with an easy-to-understand, expressive orchestral sound". Because of the abbreviated development schedule, Soken focused primarily on creating the soundtrack while his team worked on the various sound effects for the game world. The team was given less than a year on sound production, though according to Soken, it felt like "enough work for two full games in that time". Most of the tracks had specific guidelines or came from the development team's requests, though Soken was allowed to "do what [he liked]" for Titan's battle theme, although the initial lyrics had to be changed for having too much profanity. Soken sang the vocal work for some tracks, such as the battle theme for Leviathan. Soken also arranged pieces from earlier Final Fantasy games for use in special in-game events. In Final Fantasy, its music acts as a carrier of nostalgic emotions, allowing the music to bring its nostalgic emotional carrier into new relationships and environments and create a deeper connection with the game.

Final Fantasy XIV: A Realm Reborn Original Soundtrack is a collection of music from the game including both the launch and tracks from Patch 2.1, "A Realm Awoken". It was released on March 21, 2014, on Blu-ray Disc and features 119 tracks with accompanying gameplay videos. The first print run came with a special "Wind-up Bahamut" in-game pet. Emily McMillan of Video Game Music Online called the soundtrack a "truly fantastic score", and said that it was superior to the music of the original version of the game. She felt that it was an excellent merging of the traditional Final Fantasy musical style with a modern orchestral score. Mike Salbato of RPGFan also praised the album, saying that it was his favorite album of 2014 and that he "can't recommend A Realm Reborns soundtrack highly enough". Final Fantasy XIV: A Realm Reborn Original Soundtrack debuted at position #10 on the Japanese Oricon album charts for its release week and remained in the charts for eight weeks.

In addition to album feedback, critics of the game praised the score in their reviews. Kotaku Mike Fahey stated that the music was "wonderful, complex and satisfying". He often paused to remove the ambient and interface sound effects so as to hear it better. GamesRadars Adam Harshberger called it "a standout even amongst Final Fantasys storied heritage" and Digital Spys Mark Langshaw called it "a sonic feast ... that pays appropriate homage to the long-running RPG series". The soundtrack won Video Game Music Onlines 2013 Annual Game Music Awards in the Eastern category. In 2017, Guinness World Records awarded Final Fantasy XIV for having the most original pieces of music in a video game at nearly 400.

Reception

In contrast to the original version, Final Fantasy XIV has earned a generally positive reception and robust sales numbers. Prior to release, both the game's press and fans were surprised by its quality and level of polish. IGN Charles Onyett cited many specific improvements over aspects of the initial game and recognized that "it seems like Square's doing the right things to fix the many mistakes made with Final Fantasy XIVs original design". Following an impressive showing at Gamescom 2012, it won Destructoid Gamescom Community Choice Award. The editorial staff observed "the considerable changes made to the engine, HUD and combat system, transforming it into a far cry from the game that disappointed so many". However, GameSpot Jonathan Toyad was less confident about the game, praising the changes but commenting that many features would seem overly familiar to players of modern MMORPGs.

The overwhelming sentiment expressed by multiple reviewers was that the remade game executed admirably on traditional MMORPG features and succeeded at addressing the failures of the original version. For Kevin VanOrd of GameSpot, this steadfast implementation of genre fundamentals was his greatest criticism—that "it does not leap over the shoulders of the games that have come before". However, he was quick to praise the quality of the game's writing, a feature highlighted by a number of other critics. USgamer Pete Davison was particularly enamored with the story and commended the responsiveness of non-player characters to the player's actions as an effective method of worldbuilding. Many reviewers enjoyed the ability to play as multiple classes on a single character, a feature retained from the original release. Davison remarked that the differing mechanics of each class made them feel unique in their gameplay styles. Daniel Tack of Forbes.com singled out the crafting minigame as "one of the most interesting and compelling" aspects of the game.

The console versions of the game were noted for their robust feature set which put them on the same level as the PC release. Phil Kollar of Polygon lauded its implementation of controller play, calling it "Final Fantasy XIV'''s single biggest gift to the [MMORPG] genre". While the PlayStation 3 version suffered from minor framerate and loading time issues as well as reduced graphical fidelity, reviewers observed that all of these problems were eliminated in the PlayStation 4 version, creating parity with the PC release. Kollar and Leif Johnson of IGN also found that the game played admirably on PlayStation Vita via Remote Play with only minor lag.

Overall, critics were satisfied with A Realm Reborns incremental improvements. Adam Harshberger of GamesRadar compared it to a "buffet dinner [with] everyone's favorite meal", forgiving the lack of innovation. VanOrd likened the game to the "old world" of MMORPGs, safe and familiar. Johnson and Davison both saw the new version as a solid foundation for future content to be added in patches and expansions. For Kollar, it was a return to form, "the first Final Fantasy game in years to capture the energy and joy that made me fall in love with the series". Motoki Shinohara of Famitsu concluded that "I'm really glad that I'm back home in Eorzea".Final Fantasy XIV: A Realm Reborn rated well among many "Game of the Year" lists in the enthusiast press. It was named Best MMO of the year by Game Informer, ZAM, and Joystiqs Massively. AbleGamers honored it as the most accessible mainstream game of the year for 2013. RPGFan named it not only the best MMO of 2013, but also Game of the Year. Players awarded the game Reader's Choice at both ZAM and Game Informer. At industry award shows, A Realm Reborn earned the Special Award at the 2013 PlayStation Awards and the Award for Excellence at the CESA's 2014 Japan Game Awards.Stormblood won the award for "Best MMO" at Game Informers Best of 2017 Awards, while it came in second place for the same category in their Reader's Choice Best of 2017 awards. The game was also nominated for the "Still Playing" award at the 2017 and 2018 Golden Joystick Awards, and for "Best Expansion" at PC Gamers 2017 Game of the Year Awards. The game itself was also nominated for "Best Ongoing Game" at the 2019 Game Critics Awards, and for the same category along with "Best Community Support" and "Best RPG" at The Game Awards 2019.Shadowbringers was nominated for "Best Game Expansion" and "PlayStation Game of the Year" at the 2019 Golden Joystick Awards; for "Role-Playing Game of the Year" at the 23rd Annual D.I.C.E. Awards; and for "Evolving Game" at the 16th British Academy Games Awards, and won the award for "Excellence in Multiplayer" at the 2020 SXSW Gaming Awards, as well as the award for "Best Online Game" at the Famitsu Game Awards 2019. It was also nominated for Evolving Game at the 19th British Academy Games Awards.Endwalker was nominated for "Online Game of the Year" and won for "Role-Playing Game of the Year" at the 25th Annual D.I.C.E. Awards and won "Online Game of the Year" at the 26th Annual D.I.C.E. Awards; and also won "Excellence in Narrative", "Excellence in Original Score" and "Video Game of the Year" at the 2022 SXSW Gaming Awards.

 Sales and subscriptions 
By the end of the first week of release, the PlayStation 3 version of the game placed second in Japan's sales charts, with 184,000 physical copies sold. In late October 2013, Square Enix announced that the game had one and a half million registrations. It was the 16th best selling PC game of 2013 in the United States. In Japan, the PlayStation 3 version was ranked 32 in sales, with 244,574 retail copies sold. Following an extremely poor fiscal year 2013, Square Enix executives commended the game's sales and subscriptions for their role in returning the company to profitability in 2014. Yoshida has repeatedly emphasized that the robust success of A Realm Reborn was due to its traditional monthly subscription model. He sees the free-to-play model as an unreliable source of income predicated on devoting a lot of development resources to monthly consumable or cosmetic items in order to maintain profitability, leaving little time for higher quality story and battle content. He also disclosed that over 80% of players are satisfied with the subscription model and theorized that this is due to players' confidence in a steady stream of quality content because of their subscription. With the traditional model, the player base grows over time as people see the game expand, unlike a free-to-play game which can boast a huge initial player base which changes dramatically in size and revenue from month to month. Yoshida has no plans to change to a free-to-play model in the near future. The game had over 14 million registered players by August 2018, which had increased to more than 22 million by April 2021. In the leadup to the release of the fourth expansion Endwalker, Square Enix revealed that registered player numbers had reached over 24 million and that Final Fantasy XIV itself was now the most profitable Final Fantasy series game to date.

In Japan, Shadowbringers'' sold approximately 22,260 physical copies for the PS4 during its launch week in July 2019.

Notes

References

Further reading

External links

 

 
2013 video games
Active massively multiplayer online games
Fiction about meteoroids
Final Fantasy video games
The Game Awards winners
Golden Joystick Award winners
Japanese role-playing video games
MacOS games
Massively multiplayer online role-playing games
PlayStation 3 games
PlayStation 4 games
PlayStation 4 Pro enhanced games
PlayStation 5 games
Post-apocalyptic video games
Role-playing video games
Square Enix games
Video game remakes
Video games developed in Japan
Video games scored by Masayoshi Soken
Video games set on fictional planets
Video games with cross-platform play
Video games with customizable avatars
Video games with expansion packs
Windows games